Seiuli Ueligitone Seiuli is a Samoan politician and a former member of the Legislative Assembly of Samoa. He is a member of the Human Rights Protection Party.

Seiuli was first elected to the Legislative Assembly of Samoa at the 2015 Sagaga-le-Usoga by-election. He was re-elected in the 2016 election and appointed Associate Minister of Works, Transport and Infrastructure. In October 2018 he was one of a group of chiefs charged with contempt of court for bestowing the Malietoa title in violation of a court order.

He was re-elected at the 2021 election, but his election was overturned by an election petition, which found him guilty of bribery and treating and banned him from office for 15 years.

References

Living people
Members of the Legislative Assembly of Samoa
Human Rights Protection Party politicians
Year of birth missing (living people)
People expelled from public office